Still, We Believe: The Boston Red Sox Movie is a 2004 documentary/sport film documenting the Boston Red Sox' 2003 season and the team's relationship with its fans. It was directed by Paul Doyle Jr. and was first released on May 7, 2004 at the Loew’s Boston Common Theater in Boston, Massachusetts.

Synopsis
The film documents the 2003 season of the Boston Red Sox, beginning with their annual spring training and culminating in the American League Championship Series. The documentary also looks into the team's fandom, as well as the team's interactions with their fans.

Cast
Joe Castiglione
Jim Connors
Paul Constine
Steve Craven
Dan Cummings
Johnny Damon
Theo Epstein
Jermaine Evans
Jessamy Finet
Nomar Garciaparra
John Henry
Grady Little
Derek Lowe
Larry Lucchino
Harry Mann

Production
The film's title was chosen by Red Sox fans after the documentary's director asked them to choose an appropriate title from four available choices. Other alternate titles were This Is the Year, The Ecstasy and the Agony, and Always the Bridesmaid. One of the people interviewed for the movie, a fan by the name of Jessamy Finet, was later asked to perform in the 2005 film Fever Pitch based upon her role in Still, We Believe.

Reception
Critical reception was mostly positive. The Hartford Courant gave an overly positive review, but remarked that "As good as Doyle's film is, he avoids the financial issues, betraying his lack of independence from Red Sox management, whose cooperation was essential and who probably had final cut." The review from the Boston Globe was also predominantly positive, but noted that the movie covered so much material that Doyle "never goes deep enough into the season or individual games; like the sped-up overhead shots of Fenway groundskeepers that punctuate the movie, "Believe" is always rushing to the next moment."

References

External links
 

2004 films
2004 documentary films
2000s sports films
American baseball films
American sports documentary films
Boston Red Sox
Documentary films about baseball
2000s English-language films
2000s American films
English-language documentary films